Jeremiah Ingalls (March 1, 1764 – April 6, 1838) was an early North-American composer, considered a part of the First New England School.

Biography
Jeremiah Ingalls was born in Andover, Massachusetts, in 1764. When he was thirteen, his father, Abijah Ingalls, died of hardships suffered during the American Revolutionary War. In 1791, Ingalls married Mary Bigelow of Westminster, Massachusetts, and while living in Vermont worked variously as a farmer, cooper, taverner and choirmaster. Ingalls served as the choirmaster at the Congregational Church in Newbury, Vermont from 1791 to 1805, and the choir gained a reputation attracting many people from the surrounding area. In 1805 Ingalls published The Christian Harmony. Ingalls served as a deacon in the church, but in 1810, he was excommunicated from that congregation. In 1819 he moved to Rochester, Vermont and then Hancock, Vermont. Ingalls was described as short and corpulent with a high voice and an advanced skill at the bass viol. Many of Ingalls' family members were also known for their musical ability. Ingalls died in Hancock, Vermont, in 1838, aged 74.

List of tunes

Northfield
Christian Song
New Jerusalem
Fillmore
Apple Tree
Redemption
Pennsylvania

Publications
The Christian Harmony; or, Songster's Companion, Jeremiah Ingalls, (Exeter, NH, Henry Ranlet, 1805) 
"Connexion" and Jeremiah Ingalls Society Bicentennial Edition, 1805–2005 of The Christian Harmony or Songster's Companion, Thomas B. Malone, ed. This four-shape version, published for the Jeremiah Ingalls Society Bicentennial Singing in Newbury, Vermont, is increasingly in use in New England singings.

References

Further reading

External links
 
 Annual July singing in Newbury, Vt., from Ingalls' Christian Harmony: home page , 2011, 2012; minutes: 2005, 2006, 2007, 2008, 2009
 Music in Massachusetts 

1764 births
1838 deaths
American male composers
American Protestant hymnwriters
People excommunicated by Congregationalist churches
Shape note
People from Rochester, Vermont
People from Andover, Massachusetts
People from Newbury, Vermont
Songwriters from Massachusetts
Songwriters from Vermont
Deacons
Classical composers of church music
18th-century American composers
18th-century male musicians
Choral composers
19th-century American composers
19th-century American male musicians
American male songwriters